Biohydrogen is H2 that is produced biologically.  Interest is high in this technology because H2 is a clean fuel and can be readily produced from certain kinds of biomass.

Many challenges characterize this technology, including those intrinsic to H2, such as storage and transportation of a noncondensible gas.  Hydrogen producing organisms are poisoned by O2.  Yields of H2 are often low.

Biochemical principles
The main reactions involve fermentation of sugars.  Important reactions start with glucose, which is converted to acetic acid:
C6H12O6 + 2 H2O ->  2 CH3COOH  +  2 CO2  +  4 H2
A related reaction gives formate instead of carbon dioxide:
C6H12O6 + 2 H2O ->  2 CH3COOH  +  2 HCOOH  +  2 H2
These reactions are exergonic by 216 and 209 kcal/mol, respectively.

H2 production is catalyzed by two hydrogenases.  One is called [FeFe]-hydrogenase; the other is called [NiFe]-hydrogenase.  Many organisms express these enzymes.  Notable examples are members of the genera Clostridium, Desulfovibrio, Ralstonia, and the pathogen Helicobacter.  E. coli is the workhorse for genetic engineering of hydrogenases.

It has been estimated that 99% of all organisms utilize dihydrogen (H2). Most of these species are microbes and their ability to use H2 as a metabolite arises from the expression of H2 metalloenzymes known as hydrogenases. Hydrogenases are sub-classified into three different types based on the active site metal content: iron-iron hydrogenase, nickel-iron hydrogenase, and iron hydrogenase.

Production by algae
The biological hydrogen production with algae is a method of photobiological water splitting which is done in a closed photobioreactor based on the production of hydrogen as a solar fuel by algae. Algae produce hydrogen under certain conditions. In 2000 it was discovered that if C. reinhardtii algae are deprived of sulfur they will switch from the production of oxygen, as in normal photosynthesis, to the production of hydrogen.

Photosynthesis

Photosynthesis in cyanobacteria and green algae splits water into hydrogen ions and electrons. The electrons are transported over ferredoxins. Fe-Fe-hydrogenases (enzymes) combine them into hydrogen gas. In Chlamydomonas reinhardtii Photosystem II produces in direct conversion of sunlight 80% of the electrons that end up in the hydrogen gas. Light-harvesting complex photosystem II light-harvesting protein LHCBM9 promotes efficient light energy dissipation. The Fe-Fe-hydrogenases need an anaerobic environment as they are inactivated by oxygen. Fourier transform infrared spectroscopy is used to examine metabolic pathways. In 2020 scientists reported the development of algal-cell based micro-droplets for multicellular spheroid microbial reactors capable of producing hydrogen alongside either oxygen or CO2 via photosynthesis in daylight under air. Enclosing the microreactors with synergistic bacteria was shown to increase levels of hydrogen production.

Specialized chlorophyll
The chlorophyll (Chl) antenna size in green algae is minimized, or truncated, to maximize photobiological solar conversion efficiency and H2 production. The truncated Chl antenna size minimizes absorption and wasteful dissipation of sunlight by individual cells, resulting in better light utilization efficiency and greater photosynthetic productivity by the green alga mass culture.

Economics
It would take about 25,000 square kilometre algal farming to produce biohydrogen equivalent to the energy provided by gasoline in the US alone.  This area represents approximately 10% of the area devoted to growing soya in the US.

Bioreactor design issues
 Restriction of photosynthetic hydrogen production by accumulation of a proton gradient.
 Competitive inhibition of photosynthetic hydrogen production by carbon dioxide.
 Requirement for bicarbonate binding at photosystem II (PSII) for efficient photosynthetic activity.
 Competitive drainage of electrons by oxygen in algal hydrogen production.
 Economics must reach competitive price to other sources of energy and the economics are dependent on several parameters.
 A major technical obstacle is the efficiency in converting solar energy into chemical energy stored in molecular hydrogen.

Attempts are in progress to solve these problems via bioengineering.

History
In 1933, Marjory Stephenson and her student Stickland reported that cell suspensions catalysed the reduction of methylene blue with H2. Six years later, Hans Gaffron observed that the green photosynthetic alga Chlamydomonas reinhardtii, would sometimes  produce hydrogen.  In the late 1990s Anastasios Melis discovered that deprivation of sulfur induces the alga to switch from the production of oxygen (normal photosynthesis) to the production of hydrogen. He found that the enzyme responsible for this reaction is hydrogenase, but that the hydrogenase lost this function in the presence of oxygen. Melis also discovered that depleting the amount of sulfur available to the algae interrupted their internal oxygen flow, allowing the hydrogenase an environment in which it can react, causing the algae to produce hydrogen. Chlamydomonas moewusii is also a promising strain for the production of hydrogen.

Industrial hydrogen
Competing for biohydrogen, at least for commercial applications, are many mature industrial processes.  Steam reforming of natural gas - sometimes referred to as steam methane reforming (SMR) - is the most common method of producing bulk hydrogen at about 95% of the world production.
CH4 + H2O <-> CO + 3 H2

See also
Algaculture
Hydrogen production
Hydrogenase
Photohydrogen
Timeline of hydrogen technologies

References

External links
DOE - A Prospectus for Biological Production of Hydrogen
FAO
Maximizing Light Utilization Efficiency and Hydrogen Production in Microalgal Cultures
DIY Algae/Hydrogen Bioreactor 2004
EERE-CYCLIC PHOTOBIOLOGICAL ALGAL H2-PRODUCTION

Anaerobic digestion
Biodegradable waste management
Biodegradation
Biofuels
Biotechnology products
Fuel gas
Fuels
Hydrogen
Hydrogen biology
Hydrogen economy
Hydrogen production
Waste management